Hostos is a town in the Duarte Province of the Dominican Republic. It was named after Eugenio María de Hostos.

Sources 
 – World-Gazetteer.com

Populated places in Duarte Province